Northfield Mount Hermon School, often called NMH, is a co-educational preparatory school in Gill, Massachusetts, in the United States. It is a member of the Eight Schools Association.

Present day 
NMH offers nearly 200 courses, including AP and honors classes in every discipline. Every semester, students take three major courses, each 70 minutes long, as opposed to five 50-minute classes which are more typical of high schools. This "College-Model Academic Program" allows students to spend more time with their teachers and immerse themselves more deeply in academic subjects. NMH employs 88 full-time teaching faculty members, 66 percent of whom have advanced degrees. The average class size at NMH is 13 students; the student-to-teacher ratio is 6 to 1.

Students are required to participate in co-curricular activities every semester; these include athletic teams, performing-arts ensembles, volunteer work on and off campus, and activities such as working for one of the school's student publications. Students may join an extensive array of extracurricular clubs, organizations, and affinity groups.

Students involved in visual and performing arts courses, as well as NMH's performing ensembles, are supported by the Rhodes Arts Center. (See more under "Arts Programs")

With 67 athletic teams in 19 interscholastic sports, NMH offers one of the broadest athletic programs among secondary schools in the U.S. and currently holds the national prep championship title in boys' basketball and New England championship titles in girls' crew, wrestling, and numerous individual swimming and track and field events. NMH offers an extensive outdoor education program in addition to its competitive teams.

Each student is required to hold a job on campus, working three hours a week each school year. This contribution to the operation of the school stems from the school's founder, Dwight Lyman Moody, and his desire for students to understand the value of manual labor.

Traditions 
 Founder's Day -  In early February, NMH honors its founder, D.L. Moody, who was born on February 5, 1837. Each year on Founder’s Day, he is remembered with a special school meeting as well as a birthday dinner. A giant one-tined fork is passed from seniors to juniors. The fork has symbolic significance to NMH: It is reported that at an early commencement, a speaker stated that anyone could eat soup with a spoon, but it took a real person to eat soup with a one-tined fork. Moody was so taken with the image that he declared, “Whatever else you forget, remember that forever.” Over the years, seniors presenting the fork to juniors have interpreted the meaning of the one-tined fork differently, but everyone agrees that it represents a can-do attitude.
 Rope Pull - Rope Pull has been around since 1884, and has been held at Shadow Lake since 1926. Juniors and seniors, their faces painted and brimming with class pride, line up on either end of Shadow Lake, take a hold of one end of a thick length of rope, and tug with all their might. One class is the victor, but plenty of students from both sides have taken a jump in the lake in the past. (Spoiler alert: The seniors usually win.)
 Mountain Day - A tradition that dates back to 1881, Mountain Day is a surprise fall holiday, announced to the school community a day in advance. Classes are canceled and students and faculty go hiking at the peak of foliage season (seniors climb New Hampshire’s 3,165-foot Mount Monadnock).
 Bemis-Forslund Pie Race - The annual Bemis-Forslund Pie Race is a 5K footrace named for Henry Bemis (class of 1891), who donated prizes starting in 1908, and for Gladys Hall Forslund ’26, wife of longtime Mount Hermon Athletic Director Axel Forslund. Apple pies are awarded to runners who complete the course in a specified time.
 NMH Vespers - Held in a candlelit Memorial Chapel since the 1930s, NMH Vespers is a combined choral and orchestral service including Bible readings, Christmas melodies, and other seasonal music. There are two services on campus in addition to an off-campus service, held alternately in New York and Boston. 
 Sacred Concert - A combined choral and orchestral performance with history more than a century old, performed for the community by NMH students and faculty in early May.

History 

The school was founded by Protestant evangelist Dwight Lyman Moody as the Northfield Seminary for Young Ladies in 1879 (later called the Northfield School for Girls) and the Mount Hermon School for Boys in 1881. Moody built the girls' school in Northfield, Massachusetts, the town of his birth, and the boys' school a few miles away in the town of Gill. Both were "opportunity" schools created for the deserving poor who had no other means to acquire an education.

From their beginnings, both schools attracted highly diverse students. Moody's goal was to provide the best possible education for young people without privilege, and he enrolled students whose parents were slaves as well as Native Americans and people from other countries, which was unprecedented among elite private schools at that time. Sixteen of the Northfield students who matriculated in 1880 were Native Americans, as were four Mount Hermon boys in 1882; at Mount Hermon's first commencement in 1887, one student addressed the audience "in his native language, for the representatives of the Sioux, Shawnee, and Alaskan tribes in the school." An 1887 report lists 8 Chinese, 5 Indians, 2 Negroes, and 1 Japanese student at Mount Hermon; by 1889 their numbers had risen to 37 students from 15 countries, and in 1904 to 113 students from 27 countries ranging from Burma through Denmark. In the 1940s it was one of a handful of American private schools with admissions for non-white students.

Moody sent out students who founded schools and churches of their own. For example, a protégé of Moody founded Moores Corner Church in Leverett, MA. Moody viewed Christian religious education as an essential objective of his schools. Under subsequent administrations, the schools grew more theologically liberal and ultimately became non-denominational. Today, NMH offers diverse ways to pursue religious studies and personal spirituality.

By 1913, the schools were operated under the single moniker "The Northfield Schools," but remained separate institutions until 1972, when the two schools merged to become Northfield Mount Hermon, continuing to operate with two coeducational campuses. In 2005, the school consolidated its students and classes onto the Mount Hermon campus. This decision by the board of trustees stemmed from a belief that students would receive the best possible education in a smaller, more close-knit community, and from a desire to focus the school's resources on educational programs and maintain one campus instead of two. Before consolidation, the school enrolled approximately 1,100 students per year; the student body has now settled at 650, making the admission process even more selective.

In June 2016, The Trust for Public Land and the Massachusetts Department of Conservation and Recreation ensured the complete and permanent protection of 1,300 acres of forest land which was previously the Northfield campus and owned by the Northfield Mount Hermon School for over a century. Although now a permanent part of the Northfield State Forest, it had been the largest parcel of unprotected land in the Commonwealth of Massachusetts. The property includes woodlands, trails and a reservoir which will be managed by the DCR to ensure public access for recreation as well as serve as important habitat for wildlife.

Brian H. Hargrove became NMH's 12th head of school in 2019.

Athletics 

All students are required to participate in some form of physical education every term, which is not limited to interscholastic sports. The school fields 67 teams (including junior varsity teams) in 19 different sports. The football team was abolished after the 2013 season, but otherwise most other major sports are offered, and several programs (e.g., boys' basketball, girls' swimming, and both boys' and girls' cross-country) are regional and/or national powerhouses.

Mount Hermon claims to have invented the sport of Ultimate Frisbee in 1968, although Columbia High School in New Jersey has a stronger claim.

Arts Programs

The  Gold LEED certified Rhodes Arts Center (at right) is the home of all of the arts programs at NMH. It houses two concert performance spaces, a black-box theater, two dance studios, an art gallery, classrooms, art studios, practice rooms, and faculty offices. Additionally, the RAC is home to the Class of 1958 Carillon, which was originally installed in Sage Chapel in 1924. The funds to make the move possible were spearheaded by the combined Mount Hermon and Northfield classes of '58. It can be played via an electronic keyboard situated in the bottom of the bell-tower. Memorial Chapel houses the school's own tracker action organ. Andover Organ Company Opus 67, completed in December 1970 and donated by Kenneth H. Rockey is a 2-manual 27-stop, 37-rank tracker organ with a pedal compass of 30, and a manual compass of 56.

Performing groups include:
 Symphony Orchestra
 Chamber Orchestra
 Concert Band
 Concert Choir (performs two Christmas Vespers concerts every year, on campus and in either Boston or New York)
 Jazz Ensemble
 World Music Combo
 World Percussion Ensemble
 Stage Band 
 Three student-run a cappella groups: Northfield Mount Harmony (co-ed), Hogappella (all male), the Nellies (all female)
 NMH Dance Companies (three major productions each year)
 NMH Singers
 Select Women's Ensemble
 Theater: performs three major plays a year, one musical, and a student-directed one-acts festival

NMH also produces an annual arts and literary magazine, Mandala, as well as a student-run newspaper, The Lamplighter.

Co-Curricular & Extra-Curricular Groups, Classes, and Activities
Many of the activities that NMH students are involved in are considered classes or part of the work program; others are organized outside the curriculum. NMH's Student Activities office provides support, services, and resources for student organizations, including places to meet, materials, and funding.

Notable alumni
 Thomas Nelson Baker Sr., 1889, first African-American to receive a PhD in philosophy in the United States
 Elizabeth Barrows Ussher, 1891, Christian missionary
 Lee de Forest, 1893, controversial radio pioneer
 William G. Morgan, 1893, inventor of volleyball
 Howard Thurston, 1893, magician 
 Ernest Yarrow, 1897, director of the Near East Foundation
 Belle da Costa Greene, librarian of the Morgan Library & Museum
 Juliana R. Force, 1900, art museum administrator and director, first director of the Whitney Museum of American Art
 Pixley Seme, 1902, founder of the African National Congress
 Chester Barnard, 1906, president of the Rockefeller Foundation and chairman of the National Science Foundation
 Henry Roe Cloud, 1906, educator and government official
 Mohini Maya Das, 1906, Indian Christian educator, YWCA leader
 Harry Kemp, tramp poet, c. 1907 (expelled)
 DeWitt Wallace, 1907, founder of Reader's Digest
 Walter Harper, c. 1916, first person to reach the summit of Denali (Mount McKinley)
 Monroe W. Smith, 1919, founder of American Youth Hostels
 Susie Walking Bear Yellowtail, early 1920s (d.n.g), first Crow registered nurse
 S. Prestley Blake, 1934, founder of Friendly's Ice Cream
 Lawrence Ferlinghetti, 1937, poet
 Tad Mosel, 1940, Pulitzer Prize-winning playwright for All the Way Home
 James W. McLamore, 1943, founder of Burger King
 John E. Kingston, 1944, Majority Leader of the New York State Assembly and New York Supreme Court judge
 Mary C. Potter, 1947-1948, professor of psychology at Massachusetts Institute of Technology
 James Nabrit III, 1948, prominent civil rights attorney, son of James Nabrit, Jr.
 Richard Gilder, 1950, co-founder of Gilder Lehrman Institute of American History, philanthropist
 William C. Pryor, 1950, Chief Judge, District of Columbia Court of Appeals
 Anna Diggs Taylor, 1950, Chief Judge, U.S. District Court for the Eastern District of Michigan
 David Hartman, 1952, television host
 William R. Rhodes, 1953, Chairman of Citicorp and Chairman Emeritus of the NMH Board of Trustees
 June Jordan, 1953, poet, professor of African American Studies, UC Berkeley
 J. Stapleton Roy, 1953, senior United States diplomat and ambassador to China, Indonesia and Singapore
 Edward W. Said, 1953, Palestinian American literary theorist and cultural critic
 Neil Sheehan, 1954, author
 Jane English, 1960, academic, photographer
 Frank Shorter, 1965, Olympic Gold Medalist marathoner
 Lynne Anderson, 1965, Professor Emerita of Education, University of Oregon 
 William Ackerman, 1967, founder of Windham Hill Records and 2005 Grammy Award winner
 Natalie Cole, 1968, Grammy Award-winning vocalist
 Amy Domini, 1968, the "first lady of social investing"
 Viola Baskerville, 1969, Member of the Virginia House of Delegates, Virginia Secretary of Administration
 Willie Wolfe, 1969, founding member of the Symbionese Liberation Army
 Dore Gold, 1971, former Permanent Representative of Israel to the United Nations
 Chip Elliott, 1972, engineer
 Erik Lindgren, 1972, composer, leader of Birdsongs of the Mesozoic
 Tim Stryker, 1972, computer programmer
 Jim Keller, 1972, vocals, guitar Tommy Tutone
 Valerie Jarrett, 1974, Senior Advisor to Barack Obama
 John S. Chen, 1974, CEO of BlackBerry
 Helen DeWitt, 1975, novelist
 Timothy Horrigan, 1975, Member of the New Hampshire House of Representatives
 Thom Gimbel, 1977, rhythm guitar, saxophone, flute, keyboards, vocals Foreigner (band)
 Taggart Siegel, 1977, Documentary Filmmaker Queen of the Sun
 Elizabeth Perkins, 1978, actress
 Rick Boyages, 1981, Associate Commissioner for Big Ten Conference Men's Basketball
 Michael M. Gilday, 1981, Chief of Naval Operations, U. S. Navy
 Laura Linney, 1982, actress
 Buster Olney, 1982, sports writer
 Dylan Brody, 1982, humorist, author, comedian, playwright, and poet
 Kim Raver, 1985, actor
 Bryan Callen, 1985, actor, comedian 
 Arn Chorn-Pond, 1986, activist and musician
 Hasok Chang, 1985, historian and philosopher of science
 Uma Thurman, 1988 (d.n.g.), actor/model
 Samantha Hunt, 1989, novelist, essayist and short-story writer
 John Edgar Park, 1990, author, host of Make: television
 Warren Webster, 1991, president and co-founder of Patch Media
 Misha Collins, 1992, actor
 John D'Agata, 1992, author
 Aaron Schuman, 1995, photographer, writer, curator and educator
 Brian Pothier, 1996, professional ice hockey player
Yasmin Vossoughian, 1996, news anchor, Yasmin Vossoughian Reports, MSNBC
 David de Burgh Graham, 1999, Liberal Party MP in House of Commons of Canada
 Anna Schuleit, visual artist
 YaYa DaCosta, 2000, actress
 Kimmie Weeks, 2001, human rights activist; winner of the 2007 BR!CK award
 Dallas Baker, 2002, professional football player
 Tony Gaffney, 2004, basketball player in the Israeli Basketball Premier League
 Brian Strait, 2006, professional ice hockey player for the New York Islanders
 Oliver Drake, 2006, American professional baseball pitcher for the Tampa Bay Rays
 Clive Weeden, 2007, professional basketball player
 Tessa Gobbo, 2009, Olympic gold medalist (2016) women's rowing
 Spike Albrecht, 2012, University of Michigan basketball guard
 Kellan Grady, 2017, Davidson College basketball player

Images

References

External links

 
 

1879 establishments in Massachusetts
Boarding schools in Massachusetts
Co-educational boarding schools
Educational institutions established in 1879
Gill, Massachusetts
Historic American Landscapes Survey in Massachusetts
Independent School League
Private high schools in Massachusetts
Private preparatory schools in Massachusetts
Schools in Franklin County, Massachusetts
Six Schools League